Amstell is a surname. Notable people with the surname include:

Billy Amstell (1911–2005), British jazz reedist
Simon Amstell (born 1979), British comedian, television presenter, screenwriter, director, and actor

See also
Amstel (disambiguation)